Eolouka is a paraphyletic phylum of protists localized in the clade Discoba. It contains two lineages: Jakobea and Tsukubea, the last containing only one genus, Tsukubamonas.

History of classification
In 1999 Cavalier-Smith proposed a new paraphyletic phylum of flagellates called Loukozoa, containing only the jakobids. In 2013 it was modified to contain three subphyla:
Eolouka, containing the classes Jakobea and Tsukubea.
Metamonada, containing the infraphyla Trichozoa and Anaeromonada.
Neolouka, containing the only class Malawimonadea.
However, in later years these three groups were raised to the rank of phylum.

References

Protista